Caranzalem (pronounced Caranzale  the alphabet m is silent) is a neighborhood located on the west side of the city of Panaji, capital of the Indian state of Goa. It is completely located on the island of Tiswadi, one of the talukas in the state of Goa. It is known for its beach with same name.

The Caranzalem Beach is located at a distance of about 5 km. from the center of Panaji by Miramar and Caranzalem. The beach is 3.5 km long which has stretches of white sand and clear water. The beach is considered safe for swimming.

There are water sport facilities available and many hotels, restaurants and shacks in the area which serve Goan food and drinks.

Miramar-Dona Paula road runs parallel to the beach. The principle wards are Aivao, Bazar Vaddo,  Borchem Bhat, Cavialvaddo, Dando, Dona Paula, Firgozvaddo and Quevnem.

The local church is named the Our Lady of the Rosary Church. It has an old chapel  which is called the Sanctuary for Christian worship. The property of the church  belongs to the "Fabrica" that looks after the affairs of the Church. There are several Christian groups recognised by the Church like the Society of St. Vincent De Paul (Rosary Conference), Couples For Christ and Living Waters. Our Lady of the Rosary School is one of the prominent schools in Dona Paula, Caranzalem.

The Raj Bhavan and the National Institute of Oceanography are situated in Dona Paula.

References

Neighbourhoods in Panaji
Beaches of Goa
Beaches of North Goa district